Happy Since I Met You is a television play written by Victoria Wood, and broadcast on ITV on 9 August 1981.

It stars Julie Walters and Duncan Preston and was directed by Baz Taylor as part of ITV's Screenplay series. In Happy Since I Met You, Duncan Preston, who would later become one of her regular co-stars, worked with Victoria Wood for the first time. It was the last full-length drama by Wood to be televised for some years, the next being Pat and Margaret (1994). The film was notable for early TV appearances in minor roles by rising stars Maggie Steed, Tracey Ullman and George Costigan. Although Wood does not appear in the film, she sings several of her compositions including the opening song and other songs performed over the on-screen action.

Plot
The story takes place over three consecutive Christmases. At the first, drama teacher Frances is defiantly single and enjoying living alone, but shortly after spending Christmas with her family, she meets an actor, Jim and they begin dating. By the next Christmas, they have moved in together and seem to be settling with their relationship, but Frances becomes frustrated with losing her independence and by the third Christmas, their cohabitation has driven her to anger and she leaves Jim after an explosive argument. Jim tracks her down at the train station as Frances attempts to get away to find solitude, but she realises she does love Jim and the film ends with them agreeing to try again.

Cast
 Julie Walters as Frances
 Duncan Preston as Jim
 Kathryn Apanowicz as Judith
 Christine Moore as Marie
 Sue Wallace as Olwen
 Louise Cullinan as Gemma
 Tracey Ullman as Karen
 Barbara New as Mum
 Jim Bowen as Dad
 Marjorie Sudell as Auntie
 Carol Leader as Mary
 Alison Skilbeck as Elaine
 Sidney Livingstone as Dennis
 Lottie Ward as Moira
 Norman Mills as Alec
 Nellie Hanham as Margot
 Maggie Steed as Ginny
 George Costigan as Ted
 Judy Lloyd as Beverly
 Sandra Voe as Headmistress
 Fidelis Morgan as Nun
 Eileen Mayers as Neighbour
 Maggie Lane as Cashier
 Monica Lewis as Customer
 Meretta Elliot as Girl
 Phil Kernott as Attendant
 Alison Stirrup as Woman
 June Dixon, Rebecca Leach and Alison Attenborough as Schoolgirls

Production
Costume: Diane Holmes
Make-up: Sarah Horseman
Casting Director: Priscilla John
Film Editor: Bob Morton
Designer: Colin Rees
Producer: Peter Eckersley
Director: Baz Taylor

Music & Lyrics by Victoria Wood, arranged and conducted by Jim Parker.

Critical reception
Reviews were mixed, with Mary Kenny in the Daily Mail full of praise for dialogue which combined the idiomatic drollness of Les Dawson with the refinement of Jean Anouilh; whereas The Guardian's Stanley Reynolds thought it "padded out with vulgar speeches...Lines delivered as if they were heroic truths, as if they were not only great gems of wit but also terribly socially significant." More recently, Screenonline called the play "a slight but touching romance that was as much about the downs as the ups of young love."

References

External links
 Happy Since I Met You opening titles
 Happy Since I Met You at the BFI Film & TV Database
 

British television plays
1981 plays
Plays by Victoria Wood